Maria Ghezzi (Bresso, Italy, 23 February 1927 – Milan, 22 February 2021) was an Italian designer, illustrator, and painter. She was a specialist in the design of the rebus of the Week Puzzles, to which she devoted her professional life. In the enigmatic field, she was known under the pseudonym La Brighella.

Education and career
Ghezzi got her education for Brera Academy, Milian and later started working as Painter, and interior decorator.

References

1927 births
2021 deaths
Puzzle designers
Italian illustrators
Italian painters
People from the Province of Milan